Magnus Larsson was the defending champion, but lost in the first round this year.

Ivan Lendl won the title, defeating Michael Stich 7–6(7–2), 6–3 in the final.

Seeds

  Petr Korda (second round)
  Ivan Lendl (champion)
  Michael Stich (final)
  Andrei Medvedev (first round)
  Thomas Muster (second round)
  Karel Nováček (quarterfinals)
  Henrik Holm (first round)
  Arnaud Boetsch (quarterfinals)

Draw

Finals

Top half

Bottom half

External links
 Singles draw

Singles